The CERN Program Library (CERNLIB) is a collection of general purpose software libraries and program modules for scientific computing, developed at the European Organization for Nuclear Research CERN. The application area of the library focuses on physics research, in particular high energy physics,  involving general mathematics, data analysis, detectors simulation, data-handling, numerical analysis, and others, applicable to a wide range of scientific problems. Many modules are written in the FORTRAN 77 language.

The major fields covered by the libraries contained therein were:
 Elementary particle data
 Graphics and plotting
 Histograming
 I/O and structured data storage
 Numerical analysis
 Statistics and data analysis
 Detector simulation and Hadronic event generation

Lower-level parts of the CERN Program Library were most prominently used by the data analysis software Physics Analysis Workstation (PAW) and the detector simulation framework GEANT, both of which are also part of the CERN Program Library.

CERN Program Library used the year as its version, with not explicitly denoted minor revisions within a year. Besides legacy software dependency, for newer applications written in C++, CERNLIB is superseded by ROOT.

Status
Development and support for CERNLIB was discontinued in 2003. Libraries are still available "as is" "for ever" from the CERNLIB web site but with no new code, no user support and no port to IA-64.

References

External links
, CERN Program Library

Fortran libraries
Free mathematics software
Free physics software
Free software programmed in Fortran
Numerical software
CERN software